Pascagoula station is a closed intercity train station in Pascagoula, Mississippi, United States. It originally the served the Louisville and Nashville Railroad but was most recently a stop for Amtrak. The station is on the National Register of Historic Places as the Louisville and Nashville Railroad Depot, and was designated a Mississippi Landmark by the Mississippi Department of Archives and History. In addition, the station serves as an art gallery owned by the Singing River Art Association.

History
The station building was constructed in 1904. L&N added enlarged the waiting room in 1918 as well as enlarged and altered some of the rooms. 

Former Louisville & Nashville services which utilized their station included the Crescent (New Orleans - New York), Pan-American (New Orleans - Cincinnati) and Humming Bird (New Orleans - Chicago and Cincinnati). Intercity passenger train service ended in 1971. The station building was restored during the 1970s, and was placed on the National Register of Historic Places in 1974.

Amtrak service began with the Gulf Coast Limited, which operated between 1984 and 1985 and called at the station. The stop was reactivated on March 31, 1993 in service on the Sunset Limited. Damage to the rail line resulting from Hurricane Katrina in 2005 caused Amtrak to suspend service east of New Orleans, including at Pascagoula.

References

External links

Pascagoula Amtrak Station (USA Rail Guide -- Train Web)

Former Amtrak stations in Mississippi
Former Louisville and Nashville Railroad stations
Railway stations on the National Register of Historic Places in Mississippi
National Register of Historic Places in Jackson County, Mississippi
Transportation in Jackson County, Mississippi
1904 establishments in Mississippi
Railway stations in the United States opened in 1904
Railway stations closed in 1971
Railway stations in the United States opened in 1984
Railway stations closed in 1985
Railway stations in the United States opened in 1993
Railway stations closed in 2005